Simon Courcelles (born June 10, 1986) is a former Canadian professional ice hockey centre who last played in the LNAH.

Career statistics

Regular season and playoffs

Notable awards and honours
Guy Carbonneau Trophy - QMJHL Best Defensive Forward (2004–05)

External links

1986 births
Lewiston Maineiacs players
Living people
Quebec Remparts players
Sherbrooke Saint-François players
Thetford Mines Isothermic players
Notre Dame Hounds players
Canadian ice hockey centres